École secondaire catholique l'Essor is a publicly funded separate (Catholic), French-language high school located in Tecumseh, Ontario, Canada (formerly St. Clair Beach), established in 1979. It serves the Francophone population of Essex County. The name , coined by local resident Florence Limoges, is a portmanteau combining "Essex" and "Windsor".  also refers to the French word "to take flight". The school belongs to the Conseil scolaire catholique Providence.

The small school participates in a wide variety of local activities in the Francophone community. A notable example is the Franco Bowl, an annual football match against neighboring Windsor's French Catholic high-school, École secondaire E.J. Lajeunesse. The school has a very high percentage of graduates and high test scores.

Notable alumni

Brian Bulcke, football player, played in the CFL with Hamilton Tiger-Cats and Toronto Argonauts
Taras Natyshak, MPP for Essex
Kyle Wellwood, retired NHL hockey player
David Tremblay, 5 time CIS National Champion, 2014 Commonwealth Gold, 2012 Olympian – Wrestling
Paul Vallée, technology entrepreneur and CIGI Senior Fellow
Andrew Dowie, former town councilor for Tecumseh and current MPP for Windsor-Tecumseh

Sports
Sports include: Football, Hockey, Basketball, Soccer, Volleyball, Wrestling, Golf, Tennis, Badminton, Swimming, Softball, Baseball, Cross Country, Track and Field

See also
List of high schools in Windsor and Essex County, Ontario
List of high schools in Ontario

References

External links

La plume de l'aigle and L'ERGO student newspaper archives
"Shooting exercise seemed real" The Windsor Star

High schools in Essex County, Ontario
French-language high schools in Ontario
1979 establishments in Ontario
Educational institutions established in 1979